Thẩm Thúy Hằng (6 October 1939 – 6 September 2022) was a Vietnamese actress. During the 1950s and 1960s, she was a star of the film industry in South Vietnam. She had starred in many movies, some of which were co-produced with companies from the United States, the Philippines, Thailand, Hong Kong, Taiwan, and Japan.

Biography
Thẩm Thúy Hằng's birth name was Nguyễn Kim Phụng and her Christian name was Jeane. She was born in Haiphong, but her family later moved to the South and relocated in An Giang province. Her father was an official from the government of the "State of Vietnam" and died when she was only 13 years old. In her childhood, she attended Huỳnh Văn Nhứt Elementary School. Afterward, she moved to Saigon to live with her sister and went to Huỳnh Thị Ngà Middle School until the 9th grade.

At the age of 16, she entered a casting from Mỹ Vân Picture, competing against 2,000 contestants, and won the first and only prize, an acting training offer in Hong Kong. The owner of Mỹ Vân Picture had given her the stage name Thẩm Thúy Hằng. The surname "Thẩm" referred to Thẩm Oánh, a well-known musician in South Vietnam at that time and Hằng was his devoted fan and admirer.

Career
Hằng's first film role was Tam Nuong in The Beauty of Binh Duong, directed by Năm Châu in 1958. She co-starred with actor Nguyễn Đình Dần. The film was a success which brought Hằng instant fame from the audience for not only her beauty but also brilliant performance. After that, she continuously made her appearances in many movies and broke the record for "actress who starred in the most films" during the 1950s and 1960s.

In 1969, Hằng founded her own production company, which later became the Vilifilms picture in Saigon. The company's first project was Chiều kỷ niệm (Afternoon of Memories), directed by Lê Mộng Hoàng and featuring Năm Châu, Kim Cúc, Phùng Há, Thanh Tú, Huy Cường, Việt Hùng, Ngọc Nuôi and other professional actors. The film was acclaimed by the audiences and critics and Hằng's name was once more very prominent in the South Vietnamese film industry. She later created other successful movies such as Nàng (The Lady), and Ngậm ngùi (Pity). She participated in a large number of film festivals throughout Asia.

She died at home on 6 September 2022, at the age of 81.

References

1940 births
2022 deaths
21st-century Vietnamese women
People from Haiphong
Vietnamese film actresses